The Kamlang Wildlife Sanctuary, established in 1989, is the 50th Tiger reserve in India. The Sanctuary is rich with floral and faunal diversity. It is situated in the Lohit District of the northeastern Indian state of Arunachal Pradesh. The park is named after the Kamlang River which flows through it. The Mishmi, Digaro Mishmi , and Miju Mishmi people tribal people who reside around the periphery of the sanctuary claim their descent from the King Rukmo of the epic Mahabharata. They believe in a myth of an invisible god known as Suto Phenkhenynon jamalu. An important body of water in the sanctuary is the Glow Lake. Located in tropical and sub-tropical climatic zones, the sanctuary is the habitat of the four big cat species of India: tiger, leopard, clouded leopard and snow leopard.

Topography
The sanctuary is in the South-Eastern part of Lohit District. The Lang River forms its northern border and the Namdapha National Park is on its southern border. Wakro town in the Namsai Sub-Division is close to the sanctuary. The nearest rail head and airport are Tinsukia and Dibrugarh respectively. It is one of the twelve protected areas in the state of Arunachal Pradesh. 

Another notable topographic feature within the park is the "Parshuram Kund" ('kund' means "pond") which is a pilgrimage place.

Flora
The upper reaches of the park have Alpine vegetation, particularly on the Daphabum peak which borders the Namdapha National Park. The lower reaches (below ), including the foothills, have tropical wet evergreen forests. 150 tree species have been reported in the park. The main trees found in the park are Canarium resiniferum, Terminalia chebula, Gmelina arborea and Amoora wallichii. A great variety of herbs, bamboos, grasses, and shrubs are also present, and 49 species of orchids have also been reported from the park.

Fauna
Faunal diversity in the park is somewhat similar to that found in the contiguous area of the Namdapha Tiger Reserve; there are 61 species of mammals, 105 bird species and 20 species of reptiles. The cat species of the wildlife sanctuary includes The Royal Bengal Tiger, Common leopard, Clouded leopard, Marbled cat, Leopard cat and Snow leopard. Other notable animal species reported in the park are Asian Elephant, Wild boar, Sambar, Barking deer , Black Giant Squirrel and some flying squirrels. Of the fifteen species of primate found in India, six species are found in the park. These are Capped langur (Trachypithecus pileatus), Rhesus macaque (Macaca mulatta), Stump-tailed macaque (Macaca arctoides), Assamese macaque (Macaca assamensis), Eastern hoolock gibbon (hoolock leuconedys), and Bengal slow loris (Nycticebus bengalensis).

References

Wildlife sanctuaries in Arunachal Pradesh
Tiger reserves of India
1989 establishments in Arunachal Pradesh
Protected areas established in 1989